Matthew H. D. Chapman is an English journalist, author, screenwriter, director and activist.

Writing and directing credits 
Chapman's most recent film, The Ledge, which he wrote and directed, stars Charlie Hunnam, Liv Tyler, Terrence Howard, and Patrick Wilson. It was shot in Louisiana and competed in the main (U.S. Dramatic) competition at Sundance 2011. Bought by IFC, it had its theatrical release in the U.S. in early summer and has now played in over 50 territories worldwide. The film deals with an intellectual, personal, and ultimately fatal feud between an atheist and an evangelical Christian. An atheist on a ledge is forced to decide whether to die or to see someone he loves killed.  According to Chapman, it is "a piece of work that makes the basic intellectual arguments for atheism, but also makes a powerful emotional argument against cruelty of a religious kind" and the "ways people suffer as a result".

In the past he has written for directors as diverse as Alfonso Cuaron, Walter Salles, Bruno Barreto, Tony Kaye, and Alan Pakula, and for actors such as Helen Mirren, Rachel Weisz, Kevin Spacey, Johnny Depp, Bruce Willis, Charlie Hunnam, Liv Tyler, Terence Howard, and Australian actress Miranda Otto. He has won several prizes and most recently was invited into the Brazilian Academy of Letters, the South American equivalent of the Académie Française for writing "Reaching For The Moon".

Chapman has written widely on the creation–evolution controversy in the US, particularly the case of Kitzmiller v. Dover Area School District, in which 11 parents successfully sued the school district to prevent them from reading a required statement aloud in ninth-grade science classes whenever evolution was taught, and is involved in promoting science and ethical technology across the world.

He has written and directed six films, written numerous screenplays, had articles published in Harper's Magazine and National Geographic among others, and blogged for the Huffington Post.  He is the author of two books, "Trials of the Monkey – An Accidental Memoir" and "40 Days and 40 Nights – Darwin, Intelligent Design, God, OxyContin, and Other Oddities on Trial in Pennsylvania".

ScienceDebate.org 

Chapman founded ScienceDebate.org in 2007. His co-founders were fellow screenwriter Shawn Lawrence Otto, science writer Chris Mooney, marine biologist and science blogger Sheril Kirshenbaum, noted physicist Lawrence Krauss, and philosopher Austin Dacey. The organization was formed to pressure the presidential candidates to hold a debate on science and technology issues. Signatories include many Nobel laureates, hundreds of universities, university presidents, dozens of science publications, business leaders and innovators, almost every major science organization in America, Elon Musk (Tesla), former members of Obama's science cabinet, and many people in the arts. Although the candidates have not yet agreed to a science debate, from 2008 on all final candidates have answered 14 to 20 science questions publicly asked by ScienceDebate.org.  This includes Barack Obama (twice), John McCain, Mitt Romney, Donald J. Trump, Hillary Clinton, Jill Stein, and Gary Johnson.  When published online and in news media their answers reach many hundred of millions of people. .

Family 

Chapman is the great-great-grandson of Charles Darwin. His mother Clare was the daughter of the philosophy professor and author Francis Cornford and poet Frances Cornford (née Darwin), daughter of Francis Darwin. His father, Cecil Chapman, was the son of the noted physicist and astronomer, Sydney Chapman, responsible for early research on the nature of the ozone layer.

He is married to documentary film producer Denise Dumont, a Brazilian with whom he has a daughter, Anna Bella Charles Darwin Teixeira Chapman, and a stepson, Diogo Marzo, who lives in Australia.

Chapman lives in New York.

Books
Trials of the Monkey: An Accidental Memoir (Picador, 5 July 2002) 
40 Days and 40 Nights: Darwin, Intelligent Design, God, OxyContin, and Other Oddities on Trial in Pennsylvania. (Harper Collins, 10 April 2007)

Filmography
 Hussy (1980) (screenplay, director)
 Strangers Kiss (1983) (screenplay, director)
 Slow Burn (1986) (screenplay, director)
 Heart of Midnight (1988) (screenplay, director)
 A Grande Arte (1991) (additional dialogue) (screenplay: English version)
 Consenting Adults (1992) (screenplay)
 Color of Night (1994) (screenplay)
 What's the Worst That Could Happen? (2001) (screenplay)
 Runaway Jury (2003) (screenplay)
 Black Water Transit (2009) (screenplay)
 The Ledge (2011) (screenplay, director)
 Reaching for the Moon (2015) (screenplay) https://www.imdb.com/title/tt2217458/
 "The American Guest" (2021) (screenplay) 4-hour limited series on HBO/HBO Max

References

External links

English film directors
English science writers
English atheists
American film directors
American science writers
1950 births
Living people
English screenwriters
English male screenwriters
English male non-fiction writers